Harrisville is a town in Cheshire County, New Hampshire, United States. Besides the town center, it also includes the villages of Chesham and Eastview. The population of the town was 984 at the 2020 census.

Harrisville is a unique, preserved 19th-century mill town located in the Monadnock region of southern New Hampshire. There are nine bodies of water in the town, many back roads and trails to explore, and two original train depots at Harrisville and Chesham.

History

First known as "Twitchell's Mills", a combination sawmill and gristmill was built here in 1774. The town of Harrisville was formed in 1870 from lands ceded by Marlborough, Dublin, Hancock, Nelson, and Roxbury. The Manchester & Keene Railroad opened in 1878, helping it prosper as a textile mill town. It was named for Milan Harris, whose stone and brick Cheshire Mills operated until 1970, but look virtually unchanged since the mid-19th century.

Today, the Cheshire Mills are protected as part of the Harrisville Historic District, a National Historic Landmark which includes the center of town. With its red brick buildings and mills reflected in Harrisville Pond and canal, the village is frequently photographed as an iconic example of picturesque old New England. The Harrisville Rural District includes the southern part of the town near the Dublin border.

Geography
Roughly the western half of Harrisville, drained by Minnewawa Brook, lies within the Ashuelot River watershed, part of the Connecticut River basin, while the eastern half, drained by Nubanusit Brook, is in the Contoocook River watershed, part of the Merrimack River basin. Significant water bodies include Silver Lake, Seaver Reservoir, and Chesham Pond on the western side, and Harrisville Pond and Skatutakee Lake draining to the east.

Adjacent municipalities
 Nelson (north)
 Hancock (east)
 Peterborough (southeast)
 Dublin (south)
 Marlborough (southwest)
 Roxbury (west)

Churches 

The Community Church of Harrisville and Chesham was formed from Chesham Baptist Church and Harrisville Congregational Church. Chesham Baptist Church dates back to 1785. The church building was originally built in 1797, re-modeled in 1830, and again re-modeled in 1844. The Evangelical Congregational Church of Harrisville dates back to 1840, and the church building was erected in 1840–1843.

The Community Church is a member of the United Church of Christ (UCC) and the American Baptist Association, and it retains a united congregation using only the brick church in Harrisville village. The church in Chesham is owned by the American Baptist Association of Vermont & New Hampshire and is no longer used by the Community Church of Harrisville & Chesham.

Harrisville was home to St. Denis Parish of the Roman Catholic Church from 1902. In 2010 services ended following the merger with Saint Peter Parish in Peterborough and Saint Patrick Parish in Bennington. The church building is now owned by Historic Harrisville and is referred to as St. Denis Hall.

Demographics

As of the census of 2000, there were 1,075 people, 449 households, and 306 families residing in the town.  The population density was 57.4 people per square mile (22.1/km2).  There were 698 housing units at an average density of 37.2 per square mile (14.4/km2).  The racial makeup of the town was 97.77% White, 0.09% African American, 0.56% Native American, 0.28% Asian, and 1.30% from two or more races. Hispanic or Latino of any race were 0.56% of the population.

There were 449 households, out of which 31.2% had children under the age of 18 living with them, 55.2% were married couples living together, 8.9% had a female householder with no husband present, and 31.8% were non-families. 26.5% of all households were made up of individuals, and 7.8% had someone living alone who was 65 years of age or older.  The average household size was 2.39 and the average family size was 2.87.

In the town, the population was spread out, with 24.8% under the age of 18, 4.6% from 18 to 24, 25.7% from 25 to 44, 30.0% from 45 to 64, and 15.0% who were 65 years of age or older.  The median age was 43 years. For every 100 females, there were 92.3 males.  For every 100 females age 18 and over, there were 87.0 males.

The median income for a household in the town was $48,625, and the median income for a family was $55,083. Males had a median income of $34,625 versus $27,171 for females. The per capita income for the town was $25,397.  About 4.3% of families and 5.7% of the population were below the poverty line, including 8.0% of those under age 18 and 3.8% of those age 65 or over.

Education 
The elementary school is Wells Memorial School in Chesham.

References

External links
 
 Harrisville Public Library
 New Hampshire Economic and Labor Market Information Bureau Profile
 Historical Information from Access Genealogy

 
Towns in Cheshire County, New Hampshire
Populated places established in 1760
Towns in New Hampshire
Company towns in New Hampshire